Science Adventure is a multimedia series consisting of interconnected science fiction stories, created mainly by Mages, Nitroplus (for the first three games), and Chiyomaru Studio. The main entries mostly take the form of visual novel video games, but side entries span across several different mediums.

The series currently consists of six mainline entries: the first part of the series, Chaos;Head, was a visual novel released in 2008, and it is followed by the visual novels Steins;Gate, Robotics;Notes, Chaos;Child, Occultic;Nine, Anonymous;Code, as well as the upcoming Steins;???. The series also includes several spin-off games based on Chaos;Head, Steins;Gate, Robotics;Notes, and Chaos;Child, as well as many spinoffs in other mediums including anime, manga, light novels, audio dramas, and stage plays.

The main entries and their spin-offs all take place in the same fictional universe, with focuses on several different science fiction themes. Chaos;Head and Chaos;Child focus on perception, Steins;Gate focuses on time travel, and Robotics;Notes focuses on robotics and augmented reality. The player can affect the course of the story by making certain choices: in Chaos;Head and Chaos;Child this is done by choosing what kind of delusions the player characters experience. The choices in the Steins;Gate games and Robotics;Notes are made via messages set by the player via an in-game cell phone and tablet computer, respectively.

The series is planned by Chiyomaru Shikura, the CEO of Mages, composed by Takeshi Abo and Zizz Studio, written by Naotaka Hayashi along with other writers, and features character designs by artists including Mutsumi Sasaki, Huke, and Tomonori Fukuda. The developers aimed to make the series set within reality, as Shikura felt it made it more relatable and believable. The series has been commercially and critically successful both in Japan and internationally, selling more than expected for the genre and helping establishing Mages (previously 5pb.) as a game developer.

The series is published by Mages and Nitroplus in Japan, and by JAST USA, PQube, Mages, and Spike Chunsoft internationally. The visual novels Steins;Gate, Steins;Gate 0, Chaos;Child, Steins;Gate Elite, Steins;Gate: Linear Bounded Phenogram, 8-bit ADV Steins;Gate, Steins;Gate: My Darling's Embrace, Robotics;Notes Elite, Robotics;Notes Dash, and Chaos;Head NoAH have been released officially in English. Anonymous;Code has also been announced for an English release.

Main entries

The Science Adventure series consists of six core entries, along with a seventh in development. The game adaptation of the Occultic;Nine novel series, and Anonymous;Code were referred to internally as part of the Science Visual Novel series, which was originally announced to be separate from Science Adventure, but has since been incorporated into the series. Occultic;Nine was planned to be updated with new story content tying it more closely with Science Adventure. Some of the games have received updated editions with added content, and there are compilations collecting several games, such as Chaos;Head Dual (collecting both Chaos;Head games) and Steins;Gate: Divergencies Assort (collecting Steins;Gate 0, Darling of Loving Vows, and Linear Bounded Phenogram).

The main entries are as follows:
 Chaos;Head is the first entry in the series. It was originally released for Microsoft Windows in 2008; the complete version, Chaos;Head Noah, was released for the Xbox 360 in 2009, and later ported to PlayStation Portable, iOS, Android, PlayStation 3, PlayStation Vita, Nintendo Switch, and Microsoft Windows. The game follows Takumi, a shut-in who starts experiencing delusions after witnessing a murder, and becomes suspected by the police for the series of "New Generation Madness" killings.
 Steins;Gate is the second entry in the series. It was originally released for the Xbox 360 in 2009, and later ported to Microsoft Windows, PlayStation Portable, iOS, PlayStation 3, PlayStation Vita, and PlayStation 4. An updated version, Steins;Gate Elite, was released for PlayStation 4, PlayStation Vita, and Nintendo Switch in 2018, and later ported to Microsoft Windows and iOS. The game follows Okabe, who accidentally invents time travel; he and his friends use this to send emails into the past, altering the present.
 Robotics;Notes is the third main entry in the series. It was originally released for the Xbox 360 and PlayStation 3 in 2012; an updated version, Robotics;Notes Elite, was released in 2014 for the PlayStation Vita and later ported to the PlayStation 4 and Nintendo Switch. The game follows Kaito and a group of people in a high school robotics club, who are trying to build a realistic giant robot. Meanwhile, Kaito begins to uncover a conspiracy that could threaten billions.
 Chaos;Child is the fourth main entry in the series. It was originally released for the Xbox One in December 2014, and later ported to PlayStation 3, PlayStation 4, PlayStation Vita, Microsoft Windows, iOS, and Android. It is a thematic sequel to Chaos;Head, and follows Takuru, who notices that two recent murders took place on the same dates as the serial killings in Chaos;Head, and learns that he and several of his friends are potential future targets.
 Occultic;Nine is the fifth main entry in the series. Unlike the other mainline entries, it was originally a light novel series. It was adapted into a visual novel and released for PlayStation 4, PlayStation Vita, and Xbox One in 2017, and an improved version was planned, but was ultimately scrapped. The story follows Yuta Gamon, who runs the occult blog Kirikiri Basara.
 Anonymous;Code is the sixth main entry in the series. It was released for the PlayStation 4 and Nintendo Switch in July 2022. The game follows a young hacker named Pollon Takaoka, who has the "save and load" special ability.
 Steins;??? (name subject to change) is planned to be the seventh main entry in the series. It will be a thematic sequel, described by Mages as being to Steins;Gate what Chaos;Child is to Chaos;Head.

Side Entries
The series contains eight spin-off games: one based on Chaos;Head, five based on Steins;Gate, one based on Robotics;Notes, and one based on Chaos;Child. It also contains several more side entries spanning several different mediums other than visual novels, such as manga, drama CDs, short stories, and novels.

Chaos;Head
 Chaos;Head -Blue Complex- is a two-volume manga series that serialized from 2008 to 2009. It is a non-canonical adaptation of the events from the original Chaos;Head visual novel, shown from the perspective of the original game's character Aoi Sena.
 The Parallel Bootleg is a drama CD released by Nitroplus in December 2008. It is a non-canonical spin-off about an ominous creature that appears in Shibuya, whose powers and intentions are unknown.
 Chaos;Head H is a single-volume manga that was released in March 2009. It is a romantic comedy retelling of Chaos;Head's story.
 Delusion of Zero is a canonical short story that came exclusively with the Chaos;Head Audio Series Complete Box, which released in August 2009. It is a prologue to the main Chaos;Head visual novel, set in another character's perspective. It is meant to be read after finishing the main Chaos;Head story.
 Chaos;Head Love Chu Chu! was originally released for the Xbox 360 in 2010, and later ported to PlayStation Portable, PlayStation 3, and PlayStation Vita. It is a romantic comedy spin-off and canonical direct sequel to Chaos;Head Noah. A three-volume manga adaptation was released from 2011 to 2012.

Steins;Gate
 Steins;Gate: My Darling's Embrace was originally released for Xbox 360 in 2011, and later ported to PlayStation Portable, PlayStation 3, PlayStation Vita, iOS, Nintendo Switch, PlayStation 4, and Microsoft Windows. It is a non-canonical romance-themed "what if?" type of game, where Okabe builds a relationship with Steins;Gate characters.
 Steins;Gate: Variant Space Octet was released for Microsoft Windows in 2011. It is a non-canonical sequel to Steins;Gate, presented as a text-based adventure game with 8-bit art, where the player types commands to perform actions.
 Steins;Gate: Linear Bounded Phenogram was originally released for Xbox 360 and PlayStation 3 in 2013, and later ported to PlayStation Vita iOS, PlayStation 4, Microsoft Windows, and Nintendo Switch. It is a non-canonical collection of eleven side stories set in different world lines, written by several different authors. Two of the stories follow Okabe, while the rest focus on other characters.
Steins;Gate 0 was originally released for PlayStation 3, PlayStation 4 and PlayStation Vita in 2015, and later ported to Microsoft Windows, Xbox One, and Nintendo Switch. An updated version, Steins;Gate 0 Elite, is in development. It is centered around the events that Okabe experienced in an alternate timeline prior to sending a video D-mail near the conclusion of the original Steins;Gate. An anime series also titled Steins;Gate 0 aired in 2018, which serves as a continuation and finale to the visual novel's story.
8-bit ADV Steins;Gate was released for Nintendo Switch in 2018. It is a non-canonical retelling of Steins;Gates story in the style of 1980s adventure games for the Famicom. It is actually a real Famicom game, and is run on the Switch with a built-in emulator.

Robotics;Notes
 The Unpublished Memoirs of Senomiya Misaki is a canonical manga spin-off published in November 2012. It details the past of Misaki Senomiya.
 Robotics;Notes DaSH was released for PlayStation 4 and Nintendo Switch in 2019. The game is a canonical spin-off to Robotics;Notes while also being a direct sequel, and follows the former members of the robotics club. Robotics;Notes DaSH features Daru from Steins;Gate as its main protagonist, alongside Kaito from Robotics;Notes. Due to this fact, Robotics;Notes DaSH contains many story relevant links to Steins;Gate.

Chaos;Child
 Far Too Late - Slumbering Fools is a canonical drama CD that came with the PlayStation Limited Edition release of Chaos;Child in June 2015. It focuses on the past of Mio Kunosato.
 Memoirs of a Certain Wrong-Sider is a canonical light novel spin-off that released in December 2015. It presents The Return of the New Generation Madness from the original visual novel from a different character's perspective.
 Chaos;Child ~Children's Collapse~ is a canonical spin-off manga series, made up of three volumes that were released from 2017 to 2019. It serves as a prequel to Chaos;Child, following the life of Mio Kunosato before the events of the main story.
 Chaos;Child Love Chu Chu!! was released for PlayStation 4 and PlayStation Vita in 2017. It is a canonical spin-off from Chaos;Child while being a direct sequel to its events, in which Takuru does not have any interest in the strange events going on around him, and instead spends time with the game's female characters.
 Chaos;Child -Children's Revive- is a canonical light novel that serves as an epilogue for the story of Chaos;Child. It released in March 2017, a day after Chaos;Child Love Chu Chu.

Other
 Chaos;Gate is a short story crossover between Chaos;Head and Steins;Gate, released in the Nitroplus Complete magazine in September 2009, two weeks before the release of the Steins;Gate visual novel. It takes place during the events of Chaos;Head, and depicts an encounter between Chaos;Head heroine Sena Aoi and Steins;Gate protagonist Rintaro Okabe at Shibuya Station.
 Triptych of an Abrupt Chain is a drama CD for the series that was released in December 2013. It has three tracks, titled Manatsu no Hiru no Caprice, Guuzou Kaimu no Stage, and enigmatic ward, which are drama CDs for Robotics;Notes, Steins;Gate, and Chaos;Head, respectively.
 Tomorrow In The Box''' is a canonical short story from SCIENCE ADV SERIES 5 Years Jubilee, a book celebrating the series' fifth anniversary, which released in January 2014. It is a crossover between the first three entries in the series, Chaos;Head, Steins;Gate, and Robotics;Notes.

Common elements

The Science Adventure games all feature stories in the science fiction genre. They make use of real scientific concepts and theories, but also cross over into fictional territory, using fringe science and urban legends. Chaos;Head and Chaos;Child focus on individuals with the power to alter reality, and discuss topics such as perception, reality, and antimatter, while Steins;Gate focuses on time travel. Robotics;Notes focuses on several technologies such as robotics and augmented reality, as well as borrowing some concepts from the previous two entries.

The main games and their spin-offs are all set in the same world, and although presented as self-contained stories, they all contain many callbacks to the previous entries (excluding the first entry, Chaos;Head). These callbacks range from minor references, such as mentions of characters or events from previous entries, to more significant ones, such as usage of concepts explained only in another game. There is also a higher antagonist shared throughout the entire series, the Committee of 300. The Committee, based on the real conspiracy theory, seeks world domination, and is portrayed as very powerful, having control over corporations, politicians, and religions, and being seemingly impossible to beat even with time travel and control over reality.

The games are primarily visual novels, in which the player can affect the outcome of the story through choices. In the Chaos;Head games and Chaos;Child, the player does this by controlling what types of delusions the player characters experience: the player can make them experience positive or negative delusions, or alternatively choose to let them stay in reality. Chaos;Child Love Chu Chu!! additionally uses a "yes/no" questionnaire the player character takes in in-game magazines to determine the plot's direction. In Steins;Gate and Steins;Gate 0, the player affects the outcome by using the player character's cell phone: in Steins;Gate, it is done by choosing to respond to certain messages, make phone calls, or taking out the phone at specific times, as this affects what information the player character learns and how he interacts with other characters; and in Steins;Gate 0, it is done by deciding whether or not to answer the phone at certain times. Robotics;Notes works similarly to Steins;Gate, but with the player using a tablet computer and its apps instead of a cell phone.

Development

The series is planned by Mages's CEO Chiyomaru Shikura, and is developed by Mages, Nitroplus, and Shikura's multimedia concept studio Chiyomaru Studio, the latter of which owns the copyright to the series. Naotaka Hayashi has worked on the series writing, both in the role as a scenario writer and as a scenario supervisor. Recurring character designers include Mutsumi Sasaki (Chaos;Head and Chaos;Child games), Huke (Steins;Gate games), and Tomonori Fukuda (Robotics;Notes games). The games' soundtracks are composed by Takeshi Abo and Zizz Studio.

Shikura aimed for the series to be set in reality, feeling that it made the stories more relatable and believable; he said that he personally found it difficult to "buy into" fantasy, and that he was not convinced that people could get excited for "exaggerated fantasy stories". Throughout the series, the development team aimed for a rate of "99% science and 1% fantasy". Shikura called the 1989 film Back to the Future Part II a direct influence on Steins;Gate, citing how it is just believable enough to feel real. For Robotics;Notes, Mages cooperated with JAXA, the Japan Aerospace Exploration Agency, to bring further realism to the story. Due to the series' use of worldlines – alternative worlds – the developers make use of a correlation chart to track the events in the games' stories, which is updated whenever they create new entries in the series.

Abo noted that while all the games are part of one series, their sound have different images; comparing them to weather, he called Chaos;Head rainy, Steins;Gate cloudy, Robotics;Notes clear weather, and Chaos;Child stormy. He used the same process for all of them when composing the music: he started by reading the story, to understand the setting and characters as well as possible, and writing down notes about the games' emotional flow and the situations that occur throughout the stories. Using these notes, he constructed musical worldviews for the games, with a lot of weight on his first impressions. This approach, while slower than just designating songs to different areas of a game, allowed him to compose higher-quality songs with a better relationship to the games' worldviews. He was given a lot of freedom when working on the series, and was able to make the music he wanted to make for it, something he enjoyed greatly. Abo also got to compose each game's theme song, and was especially happy with Steins;Gate theme song, "Gate of Steiner", which he aimed to represent the entirety of the game with.

The Science Adventure series is partly the child of Infinity, a visual novel series primarily developed by the now-defunct company KID. It contains several references and similar themes, as well as a similar focus on science fiction elements. Some of the staff who worked with KID and the Infinity series, such as Naotaka Hayashi, Chiyomaru Shikura, and Takeshi Abo, came together to work on Chaos;Head, and later, the rest of the Science Adventure series.

Reception

The games have also received generally positive reviews, both in Japan and the West. Critics have enjoyed the story, the music and visuals, and the implementation of the gameplay elements within the visual novel presentation, although some have noted how it is complicated and difficult to unlock certain routes. Anime News Network wrote that the series has well-paced mysteries and uses creative concepts, but that the conclusions often are not as good as the set-ups.

In 2009, Steins;Gate won Famitsu annual Game of Excellence award. RPGFan included Steins;Gate on a list over the 30 essential role-playing games of 2010–2015, calling it one of the best visual novels on the market. It was also nominated for the Golden Joystick Awards, for best handheld/mobile game of 2015.

Sales
The Science Adventure series has been a commercial success for Mages, with the release of Chaos;Head and Steins;Gate helping establishing them as a game developer. In June 2011, Steins;Gate sales passed 300,000 copies sold, something Shikura noted as an achievement for its genre. A year later, he revealed that there had been more than 80,000 preorders for Robotics;Notes, which was a large improvement compared to Steins;Gate original release. Steins;Gate 0 similarly did well commercially, selling 100,000 copies during its first day, bringing the combined sales of all Steins;Gate games past one million copies. Chaos;Child original release, however, failed to chart on Media Create's weekly top 50 sales list in Japan, selling an estimated 1,415 copies.

The English console releases of Steins;Gate performed "phenomenally" well, with a large majority of the sold copies being of the PlayStation Vita version; according to PQube's head of marketing, Geraint Evans, it was the game that made PQube break through and get noticed as a publisher. Steins;Gate Elite international PC release  was among the best-selling new releases of the month on Steam.

Related media and other appearances
In addition to the games, the series has seen adaptations and spin-offs in several types of media, such as audio dramas, stage plays, light novels, and manga. There are also anime adaptations of the all four main series games – Chaos;Head (2008), Steins;Gate (2011), Robotics;Notes (2012–13), and Chaos;Child (2017) – and of Occultic;Nine (2016), as well as Steins;Gate 0 (2018), a "final route" to the story of Steins;Gate 0. The Steins;Gate anime series was followed by the anime film Load Region of Déjà Vu in 2013. A live action Steins;Gate television series is also in production by Skydance Television. There are several music albums featuring the games' original soundtracks, as well as albums featuring new arrangements.

The Steins;Gate characters Kurisu Makise and Mayuri Shiina appear in the 2012 role-playing video game Nendoroid Generation. Kurisu also appears as a playable character along with the Chaos;Head character Rimi Sakihata in the 2011 fighting game Phantom Breaker, and along with the Robotics;Notes character Frau Koujiro in the 2013 game Phantom Breaker: Battle Grounds. Multiple Steins;Gate characters also appear as bosses in the 2013 role-playing game Divine Gate.Our World is Ended is a Japanese science fiction visual novel developed by Red Entertainment and published by PQube in North America and Europe for the Nintendo Switch, PlayStation 4, and Microsoft Windows in 2019. But, this updated version, dubbed Judgement 7 - Our World is Ended'' was published by Mages in Japan for the Nintendo Switch, PlayStation 4 in 2019. Mages advertises this game as a "Masterpiece for Science Adventure fans".

Notes

References

External links

  

 
Video games about urban legends
Science fiction video games
Video game franchises introduced in 2008